Rebbachisauridae is a family of sauropod dinosaurs known from fragmentary fossil remains from the Cretaceous of South America, Africa, North America, Europe and possibly Central Asia.

Taxonomy
In 1990 sauropod specialist Jack McIntosh included the first known rebbachisaurid genus, the giant North African sauropod Rebbachisaurus, in the family Diplodocidae, subfamily  Dicraeosaurinae, on the basis of skeletal details.  With the discovery in subsequent years of a number of additional genera, it was realised that Rebbachisaurus and its relatives constituted a distinct group of dinosaurs. In 1997 the Argentine paleontologist José Bonaparte described the family Rebbachisauridae, and in 2011 Whitlock defined two new subfamilies within the group: Nigersaurinae and Limaysaurinae. The cladogram of the Rebbachisauridae according to Carballido et al. (2012) is shown below:

Cladogram after Fanti et al., 2015.

Evolutionary relationships and characteristics
 
Although all authorities agree that the rebbachisaurids are members of the superfamily Diplodocoidea, they lack the bifid (divided) cervical neural spines that characterise the diplodocids and dicraeosaurids, and for this reason are considered more primitive than the latter two groups.  It is not yet known whether they share the distinctive whip-tail of the latter two taxa.

Rebbachisaurids are distinguished from other sauropods by their distinctive teeth, which have low angle, internal wear facets and asymmetrical enamel.

Unique among sauropods, at least some rebbachisaurids (such as Nigersaurus) are characterised by the presence of tooth batteries, similar to those of hadrosaur and ceratopsian dinosaurs.  Such a feeding adaptation has thus developed independently three times among the dinosaurs.

So far, rebbachisaurids are known only from the middle and early part of the Late Cretaceous. They constitute the last known representatives of the dipldocoids, and lived alongside the titanosaurs until fairly late in the Cretaceous.

References
 
 McIntosh, J. S., 1990, "Sauropoda" in The Dinosauria, Edited by David B. Weishampel, Peter Dodson, and Halszka Osmólska. University of California Press, pp. 345–401.
 Upchurch, P., Barrett, P.M.  and Dodson, P. 2004. "Sauropoda". In The Dinosauria, 2nd edition. Weishampel, Dodson, and Osmólska (eds.). University of California Press, Berkeley. pp. 259–322.
 
 ------ (2005) "Overview of Sauropod Phylogeny and Evolution", in The Sauropods: Evolution and Paleobiology
 Wilson, J. A. and Sereno, P.C. (2005) "Structure and Evolution of a Sauropod Tooth Battery" in The Sauropods: Evolution and Paleobiology in Curry Rogers and Wilson, eds, 2005, The Sauropods: Evolution and Paleobiology, University of California Press, Berkeley, 

 
Prehistoric dinosaur families
Diplodocimorpha